Markus Wanner (born 18 February 1973) is a retired Swiss football defender.

References

1973 births
Living people
Swiss men's footballers
FC Winterthur players
FC St. Gallen players
Association football defenders
Swiss Super League players
Swiss football managers